Brithdir, Ceredigion is a hamlet in the  community of Penbryn, Ceredigion, Wales, which is 68.4 miles (110.1 km) from Cardiff and 188 miles (302.6 km) from London. Brithdir is represented in the Senedd by Elin Jones (Plaid Cymru) and is part of the Ceredigion constituency in the House of Commons.

References

See also
List of localities in Wales by population 

Villages in Ceredigion